Lipowo  is a settlement in the administrative district of Gmina Drezdenko, within Strzelce-Drezdenko County, Lubusz Voivodeship, in western Poland.

The settlement has a population of 20.

References

Lipowo